Qeshlaq (also Romanized as Qeshlāq; also known as Kishlak and Qishlāq) is a village in Soltaniyeh Rural District, Soltaniyeh District, Abhar County, Zanjan Province, Iran. At the 2006 census, its population was 18, in 8 families.

References 

Populated places in Abhar County